Two Allen Center is a 521 ft (159 m) tall skyscraper in Houston, Texas. It was completed in 1978 and has 36 floors. It is the 24th tallest building in the city.

The building has travertine flooring and is Energy Star labelled. It is owned by Brookfield Properties.

Two Allen Center hosts the headquarters of Houston-based national tax and business law firm Chamberlain Hrdlicka. Chamberlain Hrdlicka is located on the 13th and 14th floors.

It was known as the Citicorp Building in 1989. During that year Exxon had office space there.

Devon Energy had its Houston office in Two Allen Center. In October 2012 Devon Energy announced that it was closing its office there, affecting 500 jobs.

Previously Trizec Properties had its Houston offices in Suite 1100.

See also
List of tallest buildings in Houston

References

Emporis
Skyscraperpage

Skyscraper office buildings in Houston
Brookfield Properties buildings
Buildings and structures in Houston
Office buildings completed in 1978